The  was an infantry division of the Imperial Japanese Army. It was formed 16 January in Tianjin as a triangular division. It was a part of the 8 simultaneously created divisions batch comprising 121st, 122nd, 123rd, 124th, 125th, 126th, 127th and 128th divisions. The nucleus for the formation was the 3rd Cavalry Brigade and the leftovers of 28th division. The division was initially assigned to the 3rd army.

Action
30 March 1945 the 121st division formation was complete and it was assigned to the 58th army. The division travelled overland to south Korea and was transferred to Jejudo island in June 1945. The 121st division was still building a defenses on the eastern part of the island by the time of the surrender of Japan 15 August 1945.

The 121st division has returned to Japan via Sasebo, Nagasaki in October - November 1945 and dissolved soon afterwards.

See also
 List of Japanese Infantry Divisions

Notes and references
This article incorporates material from Japanese Wikipedia page 第121師団 (日本軍), accessed 28 June 2016
 Madej, W. Victor, Japanese Armed Forces Order of Battle, 1937–1945 [2 vols], Allentown, PA: 1981.

Japanese World War II divisions
Infantry divisions of Japan
Military units and formations established in 1945
Military units and formations disestablished in 1945
1945 establishments in Japan
1945 disestablishments in Japan